Bulgaria participated in the Eurovision Song Contest 2006 with the song "Let Me Cry" written by Dani Milev and Elina Gavrilova. The song was performed by Mariana Popova. The Bulgarian broadcaster Bulgarian National Television (BNT) organised the national final Bŭlgarskata pesen v „Evroviziya 2006” in order to select the Bulgarian entry for the 2006 contest in Athens, Greece. 24 entries were selected to participate in the national final which consisted of two shows: a semi-final and a final, held on 25 February 2006 and 11 March 2006, respectively. The top twelve songs of the semi-final as determined by a fifteen-member jury panel qualified to the final. In the final, public televoting exclusively selected "Let Me Cry" performed by Mariana Popova as the winning entry with 4,700 votes.

Bulgaria competed in the semi-final of the Eurovision Song Contest which took place on 18 May 2006. Performing during the show in position 2, "Let Me Cry" was not announced among the top 10 entries of the semi-final and therefore did not qualify to compete in the final. It was later revealed that Bulgaria placed seventeenth out of the 23 participating countries in the semi-final with 36 points.

Background 

Prior to the 2006 contest, Bulgaria had participated in the Eurovision Song Contest one time since its first entry in  when Kaffe and their song "Lorraine" failed to qualify to the final. The Bulgarian national broadcaster, Bulgarian National Television (BNT), broadcasts the event within Bulgaria and organises the selection process for the nation's entry. BNT confirmed Bulgaria's participation in the 2006 Eurovision Song Contest on 20 December 2005. In 2005, the broadcaster organised a national final in order to select the Bulgarian entry for the competition, a selection procedure that continued for their 2006 entry.

Before Eurovision

Bŭlgarskata pesen v „Evroviziya 2006” 
Bŭlgarskata pesen v „Evroviziya 2006” (The Bulgarian song in Eurovision 2006) was the national final format developed by BNT which determined the artist and song that would represent Bulgaria at the Eurovision Song Contest 2006. The competition consisted of a semi-final on 25 February 2006 and a final on 11 March 2006, held at the National Palace of Culture in Sofia. Both shows were hosted by Dragomir Simeonov and broadcast on Channel 1.

Competing entries 
On 20 December 2005, BNT opened a submission period for artists and songwriters to submit their entries until 23 January 2006. By the end of the deadline, the broadcaster received 126 entries. On 3 February 2006, the twenty-four artists and songs selected for the competition by a fifteen-member committee were announced. The committee consisted of Vili Kazasyan (conductor and composer), Nayden Andreev (composer), Toncho Rusev (composer), Yordanka Hristova (singer), Zhivko Kolev (lyricist and screenwriter), Veselin Todorov (musician), Ana-Maria Tonkova (music journalist), Alexander Petrov (poet), Slavcho Nikolov (musician and composer), Momchil Kolev (musician and composer), Jivko Petrov (musician), Vasko Stefanov (director) and Petar Dundakov (composer).

On 6 February 2006, "Merak" performed by Vanya Kostova and Boyan Mihaylov was disqualified from the competition after the song had been performed in September 2005 and replaced with "Nevŭzmozhna tishina" performed by Mariana Pashalieva and Marin Yonchev. Pashalieva and Yonchev withdrew their song on 10 February 2006 by the decision of Yonchev's producer and replaced with "Lyubovta e otrova" performed by Slavi Trifonov and Sofi Marinova. On 13 February 2006, Trifonov and Marinova withdrew their song in protest of the selection of the committee and replaced with the song "V nyakoi drug zhivot" performed by Plamen Petrev and Angel.

Shows

Semi-final 
The semi-final took place on 3 February 2006. Twelve entries qualified to the final based on the votes of a jury panel. The fifteen-person jury consisted of Vili Kazasyan, Nayden Andreev, Toncho Rusev, Yordanka Hristova, Zhivko Kolev, Veselin Todorov, Anna-Maria Tonkova, Alexander Petrov, Slavcho Nikolov, Momchil Kolev, Zhivko Petrov, Vasko Stefanov and Petar Dundakov. In addition to the performances of the competing entries, guest performers were 2005 Serbian and Montenegrin Eurovision entrant No Name, 2006 Maltese Eurovision entrant Fabrizio Faniello and 2006 Norwegian Eurovision entrant Christine Guldbrandsen.

Final 
The final took place on 11 March 2006. The twelve semi-final qualifiers competed and "Let Me Cry" performed by Mariana Popova was selected as the winner exclusively by public televoting. In addition to the performances of the competing entries, guest performers were Elitsa Todorova and Stoyan Yankoulov.

Controversy 
Following the Bulgarian national final, a letter signed by nine of the finalists demanded a revote due to their lines being blocked during the voting window. They also accused BNT for fixing the voting in favour of Mariana Popova. The broadcaster later denied such claims and stated that the ranking remained the same even after the late votes were processed.

At Eurovision
According to Eurovision rules, all nations with the exceptions of the host country, the "Big Four" (France, Germany, Spain and the United Kingdom) and the ten highest placed finishers in the 2005 contest are required to qualify from the semi-final on 18 May 2006 in order to compete for the final on 20 May 2006; the top ten countries from the semi-final progress to the final. On 21 March 2006, a special allocation draw was held which determined the running order for the semi-final and Bulgaria was set to perform in position 2, following the entry from Armenia and before the entry from Slovenia. At the end of the semi-final, Bulgaria was not announced among the top 10 entries and therefore failed to qualify to compete in the final. It was later revealed that Bulgaria placed seventeenth in the semi-final, receiving a total of 36 points.

The semi-final and the final were broadcast in Bulgaria on Channel 1 with commentary by Elena Rosberg and Georgi Kushvaliev. The Bulgarian spokesperson, who announced the Bulgarian votes during the final, was Dragomir Simeonov.

Voting 
Below is a breakdown of points awarded to Bulgaria and awarded by Bulgaria in the semi-final and grand final of the contest. The nation awarded its 12 points to Russia in the semi-final and to Greece in the final of the contest.

Points awarded to Bulgaria

Points awarded by Bulgaria

References

2006
Countries in the Eurovision Song Contest 2006
Eurovision